Toloo is an Iranian newspaper in Fars Province. The concessionaire of this magazine was Abdolhamidkhan Matinossaltaneh and it was published in Bushire since 1900.

See also
List of magazines and newspapers of Fars

References

Newspapers published in Fars Province
Mass media in Fars Province
Newspapers established in 1900
Newspapers published in Qajar Iran